Caragana frutex is a species of flowering plant belonging to the family Fabaceae.

Its native range is Bulgaria to China.

References

Hedysareae